The Paul Hunter Classic is a non-ranking snooker tournament. It changed from a ranking event to a 16-man invitational event in 2019. From 2010 to 2015 it was part of the Players Tour Championship. Barry Hawkins is the reigning champion. After losing its ranking event status, independent promoter Snookerstars.de promoted the 2019 event.

History
The tournament started in 2004 as the Grand Prix Fürth and was staged in Fürth, Germany. After two years as the Fürth German Open, it was renamed the Paul Hunter Classic in 2007 in memory of the late player Paul Hunter. In 2010 it became part of the Players Tour Championship.

There have been six official maximum breaks in the history of the tournament. The first was made by Ronnie O'Sullivan in 2011 against Adam Duffy. The second was compiled by Ken Doherty in 2012 against Julian Treiber. This was Doherty's first 147. The third was made in 2014 by Aditya Mehta against Stephen Maguire. Mehta became the first Indian player to compile an official 147. The fourth was made by Thepchaiya Un-Nooh in 2016 The fifth and sixth were made by Michael Georgiou and Jamie Jones on same day in 2018.

Winners

See also

German Masters, ranking tournament in Berlin
FFB Open, minor-ranking tournament in Fürstenfeldbruck

References

 
Recurring sporting events established in 2004
2004 establishments in Germany
Players Tour Championship
Snooker minor-ranking tournaments
Snooker competitions in Germany
Sport in Fürth
Snooker ranking tournaments